Fenton Area Public Schools is a public school district in Genesee County in the U.S. state of Michigan and in the Genesee Intermediate School District.

Schools
The district operates six schools:
Fenton High School
Andrew G. Schmidt Middle School
North Road Elementary School
State Road Elementary School
Tomek Eastern Elementary School
Ellen Street Campus / World of Wonder preschool

References

External links

School districts in Michigan
Education in Genesee County, Michigan